Gerald "Jerry" Hawkins (September 20, 1943 – September 30, 2015) was an American politician.

Hawkins was born in Du Quoin, Illinois. He moved with his family to Sparta, Illinois and graduated from Sparta Community High School in 1961. Hawkins served in the United States Army Reserves. Hawkins worked in men
s clothing store and in the insurance business. He also worked in the coal mines and was involved with the United Mine Workers of America. Hawkins served on the Perry County Commission. He served in the Illinois House of Representatives from 1993 to 1995 and was a Democrat. Hawkins died at his home in Du Quion, Illinois.

Notes

1943 births
2015 deaths
People from Du Quoin, Illinois
People from Sparta, Illinois
Military personnel from Illinois
American coal miners
United Mine Workers people
County commissioners in Illinois
Democratic Party members of the Illinois House of Representatives